West Bowling are an amateur rugby league club in Bradford, Yorkshire, England, which competes in the National Conference League Division One.

West Bowling play home games at Horsfall stadium. The club run teams from U5s (Nippers) up to open age, with the 2nd team competing in the Yorkshire Men's League.

Former West Bowling players who have played at international level include Leon Pryce, Stuart Reardon and Elliot Whitehead. BARLA representatives include Steven Illingworth, Lee Innes and Nigel Halmshaw. Other representative or honours include Brad Conway for the USA Tomahawks and Gareth Shephard for Lancashire.

In recent times players such as Ethan Ryan, Elliot Minchella, Daniel Halmshaw, Lewis Reed & Joe Lumb have gone on to represent Bradford Bulls, Hunslet R.L.F.C. & Keighley Cougars respectively.

References

External links
 Club Website

BARLA teams
Rugby league teams in West Yorkshire
English rugby league teams